Robert E. Lee High School may refer to:

Schools currently named Robert E. Lee High School
 Robert E. Lee High School (Baytown, Texas)

Schools formerly named Robert E. Lee High School
 John R. Lewis High School (Fairfax County, Virginia)
 Liberty Magnet High School (Baton Rouge, Louisiana)
 Legacy of Educational Excellence (L.E.E.) High School (San Antonio, Texas)
 Margaret Long Wisdom High School (Houston, Texas) 
 Dr. Percy L. Julian High School (Montgomery, Alabama)
 Staunton High School (Staunton, Virginia)
 Legacy High School (Midland, Texas)
 Tyler Legacy High School (Tyler, Texas)
 Robert E. Lee Academy (Bishopville, South Carolina)
 Robert E. Lee Middle School, San Angelo Independent School District, (San Angelo, Texas)
 Upson-Lee High School, (Thomaston, Georgia)
 Riverside High School (Florida) (Jacksonville, Florida)

See also
 Lee High School (disambiguation)
 Lee County High School (disambiguation)
 Robert Lee High School, Robert Lee, Texas